Racing Club de Lens Féminin is a French football club that competes in Division 2 Féminine Group A, and has previously competed in Division 1 Féminine. The club was founded in 2001 as Arras Football Association, and was renamed Arras Football Club Féminin in 2011. In 2020, the club became the women's department of Racing Club de Lens.

History

Arras Football Club Féminin was founded in 2001, as the women's department of Arras FA. In 2009–10, Arras won the Division 3 Group C title, and were promoted to Division 2 Féminine. In 2011, the club renamed itself Arras Football Club Féminin (Arras FCF), after becoming a separate team from Arras FA.

In the  season, Arras FCF won promotion to the Division 1 Féminine. They also reached the semi-finals of the 2011–12 Coupe de France Féminine, the team's best performance in the competition. Arras were later relegated from Division 1 Féminine in the 2014–15 season.

In 2019, a deal between Arras and Racing Club de Lens was agreed to allow Arras to train once a week at Lens'  stadium. In 2020, the club was taken over by Racing Club de Lens, in a merger/adoption deal. The team took the Lens name, and kept the badge of Arras on player jerseys alongside the Lens badge. The team now trains most of the time at La Gaillette, although sometimes at Arras, and matches are played in both locations. As part of the move, Sarah M'Barek was announced as the team's new manager. Lens announced that most of the Arras players would be kept after the takeover, and the club made eight signings in the summer 2020 transfer window. Prior to the deal, Lens were one of six professional men's clubs without a women's team.

First-team squad

References

External links
 Official website
 Footo Feminin

Women's football clubs in France
Association football clubs established in 2001
2001 establishments in France
Sport in Pas-de-Calais
RC Lens
Arras
Football clubs in Hauts-de-France